Avishai or Avishay is a Jewish given name and surname  taken from the Biblical figure Abishai. Notable people with the name include:
Avishai Abrahami, founder of wix.com
 (born 1968), Israeli journalist
Avishay Braverman
Avishai Cohen (disambiguation):
Avishai Cohen (bassist)
Avishai Cohen (trumpeter)
Avishay Cohen (born 1995), Israeli footballer
Avishai David
Avishai Dekel
Avishay Hadari
Avishai Henik
Avishai Margalit
Avishai Raviv
Avishai Jano

Bernard Avishai

See also

Hebrew-language given names
Hebrew-language surnames